The Lausur is a river in Bohemia (Czech Republic) and Saxony (Germany). It is a right tributary of the Mandau, which it joins in Großschönau.

See also
List of rivers of Saxony
List of rivers of the Czech Republic

Rivers of Saxony
Rivers of the Ústí nad Labem Region
Rivers of Germany
International rivers of Europe